Neil Scales  is a British-Australian public servant. He is currently Director-General of the Department of Transport & Main Roads, in Queensland having assumed the office in 2013.

Career and Life
Between 1999 and 2012, Scales was Chief Executive Officer and Director-General of Merseytravel in Liverpool.

Scales resigned from Merseytravel in December 2011, to take up an appointment in the Queensland Public Sector. He joined  TransLink in Brisbane, Australia, in March 2012 as Chief Executive Officer.

In March 2013, Scales was appointed Director-General of the Queensland Department of Transport & Main Roads.

Awards
Scales was appointed an Officer of the Order of the British Empire for services to transport.

References

Living people
Year of birth missing (living people)
Place of birth missing (living people)
Australian public servants
Officers of the Order of the British Empire